The Bhuyan (Also known as Bhuiya, Bhuiyan and Bhuinya) are an  ethnic group found mainly in many districts of Odisha. The 2011 census showed their population to be around 220,859. They are classified as General caste.

Etymology
The tribe is also called variously as Bhuiya, Bhuiyan and Bhuinya.The word Bhuyan and its alternate spellings are possibly originated from Sanskrit word for earth, Bhumi and possibly mean "belonging to soil". The word bhuiyan is used in many different contexts and does not always refer to the tribe. Some other tribes and some non-tribal landholders also use Bhuyan as title.

History

Early history of the tribe is uncertain. But the Bhuyan was one of the most populous and widespread tribes in colonial india. The Northern Tributary States of Orissa were the principal stronghold of the Bhuyans. It is speculated that they were the oldest inhabitants of the states of Keonjhar, Bonai, Gangapur, Bamra and Singhbhum as well as most regions of Eastern India and Lower Assam. They were also found in other plains areas of Orrisa, Bengal, Bihar, Chhotanagpur, Assam, the United Provinces, the Central Provinces, Central India Agency and the Madras Presidency where they later on underwent Sanskritisation to enter the Hindu paraphernalia as Semi-Hinduised Aboriginals like the Keot(Kaibarta) ethnic group/tribe and other related ethnic groups etc. In the feudatory state of Keonjhar and Bonai the tribe was especially powerful. They had traditional rights to install the Raja of the state.

Subdivisions

Broadly Bhuyans can be divided into two groups according to their general area of residence.

Hill Bhuyans - Known as Pawri or Pauri Bhuyan, they generally live in the hilly and inaccessible forest areas. They have a more primitive mode of life and more economically disadvantaged, and traditionally engaged in Podu cultivation. They were however politically powerful and the rulers of the Keonjhar state were dependent on their support.

Plains Bhuyans-  Plains Bhuyans live among nontribal populations and are influenced by the Hinduism and its rituals. During British rule they were the organised militia of the Keonjhar state. Both of them held the lands on
conditions of service and maintained themselves in a state of preparedness for taking the field at a moments notice to oppose their Raja or fight for him.

Culture 
The Bhuyans usually live in small homogeneous towns and villages. Their family structure is mostly nuclear. A group of families with blood relations form the smallest social unit called  or the lineage. Members of many different  or the same  form a  village. Intra-village marriage was forbidden. Marriages by capture is practised is called ghichha. Other social sanctioned forms of marriage are  marriage by elopement, by love and by negotiation. On death of a family member death pollution is observed for two to three days. At the end of it, the villagers are given a feast by the bereaved family.

The Bhuyans have a mixed pantheon of deities. They worship deities of animism such as Badam, Gainsari, and Barahipat. They also worship village deities derived from animistic origin such as Dharam Devata (Sun God) and Basukimata (Earth Goddess) and Hindu Gods like Hanuman. They traditionally take part in the Rathyatra at puri. Additionally they also celebrate festivals like Karama, Magh Porai, and Gamha Punai.

In every Bhuyan village there is a traditional panchayat which meets at the darbar (community center) whenever required. The village headman or pradhan presides over the panchayat. A group of villages form a confederation called a pidha. The panchayat at this level is called the pidha panchayat, and there is a secular headman who presides over it is called the sardar. These councils handle their community matters. In Sambalpur, bhuyan have 12 septs which are Thakur or royal blood, Saont a viceroy, Pradhan a village headman, Naik a military leader, Kalo a priest, Dehuri a priest, Chhatriya a carrier of royal umbrella, Sahu a money lender, Majhi a headman, Behera a manager of household, Amata a councellor, Dand Sena a police official. Among pauri Bhuyan bachelor sleep in youth dormitory which is called Dhangar basa (servent home) or Mandar Ghar (Drum house). Dormitory house of maidans called Dhangaria basa.

See also
Bhuiyan, Bengali title/surname
 Bonai State
 Athmallik State
 Rairakhol State

References

External links

Scheduled Tribes of India
Social groups of Odisha
Scheduled Tribes of Odisha